Sora is a south Munda language of the  Austroasiatic language of the Sora people, an ethnic group of eastern India, mainly in the states of Odisha and Andhra Pradesh. Sora contains very little formal literature but has an abundance of folk tales and traditions. Most of the knowledge passed down from generation to generation is transmitted orally. Like many languages in eastern India, Sora is listed as 'vulnerable to extinction' by UNESCO. Sora speakers are concentrated in Odisha and Andhra Pradesh. The language is endangered as per as International Mother Language Institute (IMLI).

Distribution
Speakers are concentrated mainly in Ganjam District, Gajapati District (central Gumma Hills region (Gumma Block), etc.), and Rayagada District, but are also found in adjacent areas such as Koraput and Phulbani districts; other communities exist in northern Andhra Pradesh (Vizianagaram District and Srikakulam District).

History 
The Sora language has faced a wavelike pattern of usage—that is, the number of people who speak Sora climbed steadily for decades before crashing down. In fact, the number of people who spoke Sora went from 157 thousand in 1901 to 166 thousand in 1911. In 1921, this number marginally rose to 168 thousand and kept climbing. In 1931, speaker numbers jumped to 194 thousand but in 1951, a period of exponential growth occurred, with speaker numbers jumping to 256 thousand. in 1961, numbers topped at 265 thousand speakers before crashing down in 1971 when speaker numbers dropped back down to 221 thousand.

Culture 
Sora is spoken by the Sora people, who are a part of the Adivasi, or tribal people, in India, making Sora an Adivasi language. Sora is found in close proximity to Odia and Telugu speaking peoples making a great deal of Sora people bilingual. Sora does not have much in the way of literature except for a few songs and folk tales which are usually transmitted orally. Sora religion is a mix of traditional shamanistic rituals and the surrounding Hinduism predominant in surrounding populations. One particular Sora ritual has to do with death. Sora retains a unique shamanistic view on the subject of death. It is said that people who die from murders, suicides, or accidents are said to be taken, in a sense, by the Sun spirit. These people, called usungdaijen, are then said to reside in the Sun itself after death. Sora uses spirits to explain many phenomena. For example, if a girl in no relationship has a headache or a migrane, it is said that the Pangalsum spirit, or Bachelor Spirit who contains the souls of men who have died before wedlock, has placed a wreath of flowers tightly around the girls head as a symbol of claiming her as his wife.

Phonology

On a similar note, our understanding of Sora phonology is limited at best but there are some generalizations that can be made. Most syllables are of the Consonant, Vowel, Consonant form and morphemes usually contain one to three syllables. There are 18 identifiable consonants and they fall into most of the established origins of sound. Five consonants originate from the palate while only one consonant originates from the glottis. An interesting facet of Sora consonants is that they contain an inherent ɘ vowel. Although vowels may be pronounced differently, there exist only six vowels in Sora. There are no diacritics and aspiration varies depending on the speaker. It is likely that the influence of English, Odia, and Telugu has also affected vowel pronunciation over the course of Sora's use. Pronunciations also change in prevocalic (occurring before a vowel) and non prevocalic environments.

Consonants

Vowels

Grammar 
Sora uses grammatical devices, including subject and object agreement, word order, and noun compounding to show case. It is seen as a predominantly nominative-accusative language and once again differs from most other languages with its lack of a passive structure. However, just because Sora lacks a passive case does not mean other established forms of grammatical case are also missing. Rather, Sora has some complex grammatical cases. A few examples are as follows:

 Nominative
 Accusative
 Locative
 Instrumental
 Comitative
 Benefactive
 Genitive

In addition, Sora, like many other Munda languages, uses relator nouns to link nouns with the other parts of the sentence in order to provide a more specific meaning, called compounding. These monosyllabic nouns that enhance meaning are called Semantic relator nouns and are used widely in Sora. Sora also has a combining form for every noun in addition to the full form of the noun. The combining form allows the noun to be attached to a verb root to create a more semantically complex word, similar to compounding in other languages. Sora contains prefixes, infixes, and suffixes to form its affixation but only uses its suffixes to change the possession of nouns. The combining form is the form seen when the noun is being used with a verb or another full formed noun. The full form is the form seen when the noun is standing alone or functioning not in tandem with other parts of speech. Some templates of Sora combinations between nouns and verbs are as follows:

Verb + Combined Form

Verb + Combined Form + Combined Form

Full Form + Combined Form

Full Form + Combined Form + Combined Form

An example of a Full Form noun shortened into the Combined Form is as follows: mənra, the Full Form of man, transform into the combined form word --mər . The two—indicate that a Noun (Full or Combined) or Verb has to precede the Combined Form noun; that is the Combined Form Noun can not stand on its own. Although by no means conclusive, a few general guidelines about the Combined Form is that it depends on where the combination with the verb or other noun is to take place. If the combined form is to an infix, then its resulting form will be different from if it were to be combined as a prefix. Some examples of Full Form Nouns and their Combined Forms are as follows:

Full Form Combined Form English Translation

ədɘ'ŋ --dɘ'ŋ honeycomb

ərɘ'ŋ --rɘ'ŋ sour

bɘ'nra'j --bɘn flour

ba'ra' --bal gun barrel

kəṛíŋ—diŋ drum

Vocabulary  
Sora borrows words from surrounding languages like Telugu and Oriya. An example of a word borrowed from Oriya is kɘ'ra'ñja' which is a tree name. From Telugu mu'nu''', which means black gram, is borrowed. Moreover, within the Munda family itself most words appear to be mutually intelligible owing to minor differences in pronunciations and phonology. Kharia and Korku, two other Munda languages, share mutually intelligible words with Sora. For example, the number 11 in Kharia is ghol moŋ, in Korku it is gel ḑo miya, and in Sora it is gelmuy. Each 11 in each language looks and sounds remarkably similar to the other 11's. This phenomenon is not just contained in numbers but rather a great deal of vocabulary is mutually intelligible among the Munda languages. Within the Austroasiatic language family more knowledge about Sora vocabulary can be found. The Mon-Khmer language family which encompasses the languages primarily spoken in Southeast Asia has lexical cognates with the Munda family. That means that some words found in Sora are of direct proto-Austroasiatic origin and share similarities with other derived Austroasiatic language families. Words that relate to the body, family, home, field, as well as pronouns, demonstratives, and numerals are the ones with the most cognates.

 Numerals 
The Sora numeral system uses a base 12, which only a few other languages in the world do. Ekari, for example, uses a base 60 system. For example, 39 in Sora arithmetic would be thought of as (1 * 20)+ 12 + 7. Here are the first 12 numerals in the Sora language :

English: one two three four five six seven eight nine ten eleven twelveSora: aboy bago yagi unji monloy tudru gulji thamji tinji gelji gelmuy migelSimilar to how English uses the suffix from the numeral ten after twelve (such as thirteen, fourteen, etc.), Sora also uses a suffix assignment to numerals after 12 and before 20. Thirteen in Sora is expressed as migelboy (12+1), fourteen as migelbagu (12+2), etc. Between numerals 20 and 99, Sora adds the suffix kuri to the first constituent of the numeral. For example, 31 is expressed as bokuri gelmuy and 90 as unjikuri gelji.

The Sora number system was featured in a puzzle by Lera Boroditsky, found in the More Resources section associated with her "TED talk".

 Writing system 
The Sora language has multiple writing systems. One is called Sora Sompeng, a native writing system created only for the Sora language. It was developed in 1936 by Mangei Gomango.

Sora is also written in the Odia alphabet by the bilingual speakers of Odisha.

Similarly, Telugu is used by the bilingual speakers living in Andhra Pradesh and Telangana.

Finally, the last commonly used script to write Sora is the Latin script.

Media coverage
Sora was one of the subjects of Ironbound Films' 2008 American documentary film The Linguists, in which two linguists attempted to document several moribund languages.

Further reading
Hammarström, Harald; Forkel, Robert; Haspelmath, Martin; Bank, Sebastian, eds. (2016). "Sora". Glottolog 2.7. Jena: Max Planck Institute for the Science of Human History.
Ramamurti, R. S. (1931). A Manual of the Sora (Savara) Language. Delhi: Mittal Publication.Veṅkaṭarāmamūrti, G. (1986). Sora–English dictionary''. Delhi: Mittal Publication.

References

External links
 Austroasiatic Languages: Munda and Mon–Khmer

Munda languages
Endangered languages of India